There are at least 22 named trails in Park County, Montana according to the U.S. Geological Survey, Board of Geographic Names.  A trail is defined as: "Route for passage from one point to another; does not include roads or highways (jeep trail, path, ski trail)."

 Ash Mountain Trail, el.  
 Beaver Lakes Loop Trail, el.  
 Beaver Lakes Loop Trail, el.  
 Buffalo Plateau Trail, el.  
 Buffalo Plateau Trail, el.  
 Coyote Creek Trail, el.  
 Coyote Creek Trail, el.  
 Fawn Pass Trail, el.  
 Highland Trail, el.  
 Jardine-Hellroaring Trail, el.  
 Lower Blacktail Trail, el.  
 Poacher Trail, el.  
 Pole Gulch Trail, el.  
 Pole Gulch Trail, el.  
 Pyramid Trail, el.  
 Republic Trail, el.  
 Rescue Creek Trail, el.  
 Sidehill Trail, el.  
 Snowbank Trail, el.  
 Sportsman Lake Trail, el.  
 Wallace Creek Trail, el.  
 Yellowstone River Trail, el.

Further reading

See also
 List of trails of Montana
 Trails of Yellowstone National Park

Notes

Geography of Park County, Montana
 Park County
Transportation in Park County, Montana